Shes Saptak (Bengali: শেষ সপ্তক; English: The Last Octave) is a Bengali poetry book written by Rabindranath Tagore. It was published in 1935. Tagore wrote the poems of the book in the style, prose poems, like "Punascha", "Patraput" and "Shyamali", etc.

List of poems 
The poems of "Shes Saptak" are:

 Sthir jenechilam, peyechi tomake
 Ekdin tuchha alaper phank diye
 Phuriye gelo pouser din
 Joubaner prantasimay
 Barsha nemeche prantare animantrane
 Diner prante ashechi
 Anek hajar bacharer
 Mone mone dekhlum
 Bhalobese mon balle
 Mone hoyechila aj sab-kata durgraha
 Bhorer alo-adhanre 
 Keu chena noy
 Rastay cholte cholte
 Kalo andhakarer talay
 Ami badal karechi amar basa
Parechi aaj rekhar mayay
Amar kache shunte cheyecha
Amra ki sattie chai shoker abasan
Takhan bayos chilo kancha
Sedin amader chilo khola sabha
Nutan kalpe
Shuru hatei o amar sanga dhareche
Aaj sharater aloy ai je cheye dekhi
Amar phulbaganer phulgulike
Panchiler edhare
Akashe cheye dekhi 
Amar ai choto kalsita pete rakhi
Tumi prabhater shukatara
Anekkaler ektimatra din
dekha halo
Paray ache club
Pilsujer upar pitaler pradip
Badshaher hukum
Pathik ami
Anger bandhane bandhapara amar pran
Shiter ruddor
Biswalakshmi
He jakhha, sedin prem tomader
Ora ase amake bole
Hrisi kobi balechen
Halka amar swabhab
Tumi golpa jamate para
Panchiche boishakh chaleche
Amar shes belakar ghorkhani
Takhan amar ayur tarani
Takhan amar bayos chilo saat
Sanjojan (Smriti-patheya)

References

External links 
 rabindra-rachanabali.nltr.org

1935 poetry books
Bengali poetry collections
Poetry collections by Rabindranath Tagore
Indian_poetry_books
Rabindranath_Tagore